Nils Harald Ossian Treutiger (born 5 June 1956) is a Swedish journalist and television host. Born in Göteborg, he is best known for co-hosting the 1992 Eurovision Song Contest held in Malmö after Carola Häggkvist won in 1991.

Treutiger was the first host of Expedition Robinson, internationally known as Survivor, as the show was first aired in Sweden in 1997 before becoming an international franchise. He was replaced by Anders Lundin in 1999 after two seasons.

See also
List of Eurovision Song Contest presenters

References

External links

1997 Swedish Radio interview about Expedition Robinson 

1956 births
Swedish television personalities
University of Gothenburg alumni
People from Gothenburg
Living people